"Magic " is a song by New Zealand-Australian rock band Dragon released in November 1983 as the second single from the group's seventh studio album Body and the Beat (1984). The song peaked at number 33 on the Australian Kent Music Report.

Track listing 
 "Magic" (Robert Taylor, Marc Hunter) - 3:57
 "April Sun in Cuba"  (Marc Hunter, Paul Hewson) (Live In Concert 1982) -

Charts

References 

Dragon (band) songs
1983 singles
1983 songs
Polydor Records singles
Mercury Records singles
Songs written by Marc Hunter